Hynnekleiv is a village in Froland municipality in Agder county, Norway. The village is located at the junction of the Norwegian National Road 41 and the Norwegian County Road 42. The Sørlandsbanen railway line runs through the village as well, but the railway station here was closed in 2003. The river Tovdalselva flows past the village on the west side.

References

Villages in Agder
Froland